Krivokapić, is a Montenegrin and Serbian surname, a patronymic of the nickname krivokapa, which means "crooked cap". Bearers of the surname traditionally exist in Upper Cuce, in western Montenegro, from where they have migrated to Prokuplje, southern Serbia (in 1875). The families are predominantly Orthodox Christian.

It may refer to following people:

 Miloš Krivokapić (1819–1907), Montenegrin commander
 Miodrag Krivokapić (born 1949), Serbian actor
 Milorad Krivokapić (born 1956), Serbian water polo player
 Boris Krivokapić (born 1958), Serbian professor and scientist
 Zdravko Krivokapić (born 1958), Prime Minister of Montenegro
 Miodrag Krivokapić (born 1959), Montenegrin footballer
 Ranko Krivokapić (born 1961), Montenegrin politician
 Marko Krivokapić (born 1976), Serbian handball player
 Radivoj Krivokapić (born 1953), Yugoslav handball player
 Radovan Krivokapić (born 1978), Serbian footballer
 Goran Krivokapić (born 1979), Montenegrin classical guitarist
 Milorad Krivokapić (born 1980), Serbian-Hungarian handball player

References

Sources
 
 
 

Montenegrin surnames
Serbian surnames